South Mountain is a mountain located in Greene County, New York east of Haines Falls, New York. Located to the southwest is Roundtop Mountain. High Peak drains south into Kaaterskill Creek and north into North-South Lake.

References

Mountains of Greene County, New York
Mountains of New York (state)